Mehrabad-e Mazidi (also Romanized as Mehrābād-e Mazīdī; also known as Mehrābād) is a village in Fasarud Rural District, in the Central District of Darab County, Fars Province, Iran. At the 2006 census, its population was 328, in 68 families.

References 

Populated places in Darab County